M.O.B. is the ninth studio album by American rapper Project Pat from Memphis, Tennessee. It was released on September 8, 2017 through X-Ray Records, a division of Cleopatra Records. It features guest appearances from Juicy J and Young Dolph. The album was supported by its lead single "Money", which was produced by XTC Beats and released on September 5, 2017.

Track listing

References

External links 
M.O.B. by Project Pat at AllMusic
M.O.B. by Project Pat on Bandcamp
M.O.B. by Project Pat at Discogs
M.O.B. by Project Pat on iTunes

2017 albums
Project Pat albums
Cleopatra Records albums